The Millau Bridge class is a series of 10 container ships that are now operated by the Japanese shipping company Ocean Network Express (ONE). The ships have a maximum theoretical capacity of 13,900 TEU.

The first ships were ordered by K Line in 2013. In 2014, K line announced it had ordered 5 additional ships that would be delivered in 2018.

List of ships

References 

Container ship classes